Spyros Spyrou may refer to:
 Spyros Spyrou (athlete)
 Spyros Spyrou (judoka)